This is a list of rivalry games in college football in the United States. The list also shows any trophy awarded to the winner of the rivalry between the teams.

NCAA Division I Football Bowl Subdivision

|}

Rivalries involving more than two teams

NCAA Division I Football Championship Subdivision

|}

Rivalries involving more than two teams

Rivalries involving FBS and FCS teams
This list is restricted to rivalries whose participants are currently in different Division I football subdivisions, and have played one another while in different subdivisions. Most of these began when both teams competed in the same (sub)division.

In this list, the FCS team is in italics.

|}

NCAA Division II

|}

NCAA Division III 

|}

Notes

Rivalries involving more than two teams

Longest continuous NCAA college football rivalries

Following are the longest active continuously-played series in NCAA college football. Many historic series were interrupted by World War I, the 1918 flu pandemic and World War II.  More recently, other longstanding rivalries were terminated by the 2010–2014 NCAA conference realignment or were interrupted by the COVID-19 pandemic.

Note: The NCAA also lists as "continuous" the following rivalries interrupted by gaps during war years: North Carolina–Virginia (1910–1916, 1919–current); Mississippi–Mississippi State (1915–1942, 1944–current); Auburn–Georgia (1919–1942, 1944–current); Tennessee–Kentucky (1919–1942, 1944–current). Other rivalries were also interrupted during war years, for example: Harvard–Yale (1897–1916, 1919–1943, 1945–present); Princeton–Yale (1876–1916, 1919–1943, 1945–present); Miami–Cincinnati (1909–1942, 1945–present); and Oregon-Oregon State (1912–1942, 1945–present). The NCAA does not explain how it selects only some interrupted rivalries to count as "continuous."

Longest interrupted NCAA college football rivalries
Following are the NCAA Division I and II series that continued for the most consecutive seasons before being interrupted. Seven of the sixteen series on this list are defunct rivalries from the old Big Eight Conference. Six are rivalries interrupted in 2020 due to the COVID-19 pandemic.

See also
 Lambert-Meadowlands Trophy (top team in the Northeast)
 College rivalry#United States

Notes

References

Further reading
 

rivalry games
Football rivalry games